Jeffrey Reddick (born 12 July 1969) is an American screenwriter and film director, best known for creating the Final Destination franchise.

Life and career
Reddick was born in Jackson, Kentucky and attended Breathitt County High School. He studied at Berea College, and is a member of the Bahá'í Faith.

When Reddick was fourteen, he wrote a ten-page treatment of a prequel to A Nightmare on Elm Street and sent it to New Line Cinema. The studio did not accept unsolicited material, and it was returned unread. Reddick proceeded to contact studio founder Robert Shaye and asked him to read the treatment. Shaye read it and responded. This was the beginning of a letter-and-phone relationship with Shaye and his assistant that lasted for years. While in college, Jeffrey landed an internship at New Line and worked for the studio for almost eleven years. In 2000, New Line produced Reddick's screenplay for the film Final Destination.

Reddick is mostly known for writing horror films, but he recently worked on two animated series for Netflix, including a spin-off of the classic Japanese comic book Usagi Yojimbo by Stan Sakai. He is currently adapting the YA book series, The Adventures of Young Captain Nemo. He made his directorial debut with the his mystery thriller Don't Look Back in 2020. Reddick is openly gay.

Filmography

Films

Television

References

External links

1969 births
Living people
American male screenwriters
People from Jackson, Kentucky
American LGBT screenwriters
American gay writers
Berea College alumni
Film directors from Kentucky
Screenwriters from Kentucky